Augustine Nnamani was a former justice of the Supreme Court of Nigeria, he was appointed on August 15, 1979 and was on the court for 11 years. Prior to the appointment, he was Attorney General of the Nigerian Minister of Justice.

References

Nigerian jurists
1934 births
1990 deaths
Supreme Court of Nigeria justices